Torre was a municipality in the district of Blenio in the canton of Ticino in Switzerland.

On 25 January 2005, the cantonal authorities announced that Torre would merge with Aquila, Campo Blenio, Ghirone and Olivone to form a new municipality to be called Blenio. This union was carried through on 22 October 2006.

References

Former municipalities of Ticino